Mahalingam Sasikumar (born 28 September 1974) is an Indian film director, actor, singer and producer. He worked as an assistant director for director Bala in Sethu (1999), also worked for director Ameer in his first two films Mounam Pesiyadhe   (2002) and Raam (2005). He is best known in the Tamil film industry for his debut film Subramaniapuram (2008), which became a blockbuster.

Early life 
Sasikumar studied at St. Peters School Kodaikanal and then went on to study business administration in Vellaichamy Nadar College, Madurai.

Career

2008-2018: Beginning as an actor, director and producer 

Sasikumar acted in Subramaniapuram (2008) as Parama and in Naadodigal (2009) as Karuna, directed by Samuthirakani. Story revolves around four men and two women who live their life with utmost Joy and a Goal to Achieve. Among the actors Sasikumar is the pick of the lot, he is hero material and has given an amazingly candid performance. He also acted in Poraali (2011), Sasikumar plays the lead role in the film & also he is the producer of the film. Followed by Malayalam film, Masters  (2012) as Milan Paul alongside Prithviraj. Prithviraj and Sasikumar will appear as bosom friends in this movie, who try different ways to fulfill their social responsibility. Masters is somewhat different from the usual crime thriller, but it leaves us with a feeling that it could have been better. It was followed by drama film, Sundarapandian (2012). The cast includes Lakshmi Menon and Vijay Sethupathi. In 2013, he acted in Kutti Puli, with his previous movie pair Lakshmi Menon. The film is released to positive reviews. In 2014, a romantic action film Bramman. The film will definitely be a huge disappointment to fans.

In 2013, Sasikumar began work on Bala's Tharai Thappattai and portrayed Sannasi, a nadaswaram player who heads a Karagattam troupe. To look the part, he had to train for a month with folk singers and dancers brought in by Bala, while he also grew long hair for the role. The film's production progressed over two years, while the team were forced to have a three-month break in 2015 after Sasikumar had dislocated his hand while shooting for the film's climax. The soundtrack has been composed by Ilaiyaraaja. The film has garnered a lot of expectations in being promoted as the 1000th film score of Ilaiyaraaja. The soundtrack consists of seven tracks: five songs and two theme scores. The film is released on 14 January 2016 to mostly positive reviews. Vetrivel,  Appa,  Kidaari and Balle Vellaiyathevaa follow up. In 2017, he acted in Kodiveeran. This is the second time that this actor and director joining hands after Kutti Puli. Kodi Veeran is produced by M. Sasikumar's Company Productions. In 2018, Asuravadham. After a series of underwhelming films, the film has received mixed reviews from critics and audience.

2019-present 

He starts the year with Rajinikanth's' Petta (2019) directed by Karthik Subbaraj. The next project is Suseenthiran's Kennedy Club. Sify relieves: "Sasikumar is not at all convincing as a Kabbadi player and maintains the same age-old". The film is an average sports drama. Sasikumar was roped in to star in Gautham Vasudev Menon's Enai Noki Paayum Thota (2019), which stars Dhanush and Megha Akash . In the film, Sasikumar acted as Dhanush's elder brother. After Naadodigal 2 (2020), he starred in family films like Udanpirappe (2021), MGR Magan (2021) and Raajavamsam (2021).

Production 

After the success of Subramaniapuram, Sasikumar produced Pasanga (2009), directed by debutant Pandiraj, and the self-directed Easan (2010). His production ventures include Poraali (2011) and  Sundarapandian (2012). He produced Thalaimuraigal directed by Balu Mahendra who acts along with Sasikumar for the first time in his career and won the National Award (India) in April 2014. He also produced Tharai Thappattai (2016), Kidaari (2016), Balle Vellaiyathevaa (2016) and Kodiveeran (2017).

Filmography

Director

All films are in Tamil, unless otherwise noted.

Actor

Producer

As singer

References

External links 

1974 births
Living people
Male actors from Madurai
Tamil film directors
Tamil-language film directors
Male actors in Tamil cinema
Film producers from Tamil Nadu
Tamil film producers
Filmfare Awards South winners
Male actors in Malayalam cinema
Male actors in Telugu cinema
21st-century Indian male actors
Indian male film actors
Indian film distributors
Film directors from Tamil Nadu
21st-century Indian film directors
Producers who won the Best Film on National Integration National Film Award